Elissa Mielke is a Canadian singer/songwriter, actress, and fashion model. 
Mielke is best known for her own music, and for music videos like The Weeknd's "The Zone" featuring Canadian rapper Drake,
and for Lion Attack'''s short film Mobius which was chosen for La Semaine de la Critique at the Cannes Film Festival'' in 2017.  Mielke was born in rural Ontario, but now lives in Toronto, Ontario and in London, England for part of the year. She released her first EP in 2015 under the pseudonym "Mieke." 
In 2021, Mielke released her first EP, "Finally" on Mom+Pop/Slashie labels under her full name. 
In 2022, Mielke released the single "Paper Moth Flame."

References

Canadian female models
Living people
Year of birth missing (living people)